Robert Dolman (born October 28, 1949) is a Canadian screenwriter, actor, director and producer.

His work in television includes SCTV, SCTV Network 90, and WKRP in Cincinnati. Among his film credits are the screenplays for Willow and Far and Away, as well as The Banger Sisters and How to Eat Fried Worms, both of which he also directed. He is a writer and producer on the 2022 Disney+ Willow TV series, returning to the franchise that he helped to co-create.

Dolman was married at one time to actress Andrea Martin, with whom he has two sons as well as a grandchild. His late sister, Nancy Dolman, was also an actress, as well as the wife of comedian and actor Martin Short.

Filmography
WKRP In Cincinnati (1981) (TV)
Little Shots (1983) (TV)
SCTV Network 90 (1981-1983) (TV)
SCTV (1983-1984) (TV)
Cowboy Joe (1987) (TV) (also Executive Producer)
Willow (1988) 
Far and Away (1992)
The Banger Sisters (2002) (also Director)
How to Eat Fried Worms (2006) (also Director & Producer)
Out of Brooklyn (2010) (also Director & Producer)
Willow (2022) (TV)

References

External links 
 

1949 births
Canadian male screenwriters
Living people
Primetime Emmy Award winners
20th-century Canadian male actors
Canadian male film actors
Canadian male television actors
Canadian television writers
Male actors from Toronto
Film directors from Toronto
Writers from Toronto
Canadian male television writers
Place of birth missing (living people)
20th-century Canadian screenwriters
20th-century Canadian male writers
21st-century Canadian screenwriters
21st-century Canadian male writers